During the 1996–97 English football season, Crystal Palace competed in the Football League First Division.

Season summary
Crystal Palace finished 6th place in the First Division and gained promotion to the Premier League after a 1–0 win in the play-off finals over Sheffield United at Wembley, David Hopkin scoring the winner in the 89th minute.

Final league table

Results
Crystal Palace's score comes first

Legend

Notable Games in First Division

6–1 vs Reading away followed by 6–1 vs Southend

Both games had 6 different scorers for Palace

First Division Play Offs

Play Off Semi-Finals:

Palace... 3 Wolves... 1(Shipperley, Freedman (2))
Wolves...2 Palace... 1 (Hopkin)

Play Off Final at Wembley:

Palace... 1 Sheffield United... 0 (Hopkin)

FA Cup

League Cup

Players

First-team squad
Squad at end of season

Left club during season

References

Notes

Crystal Palace F.C. seasons
Crystal Palace